Kresek is a district within Tangerang Regency in the province of Banten, Java, Indonesia. The population at the 2010 Census was 60,735.

Tangerang Regency
Districts of Banten
Populated places in Banten